Rashid al-Din al-Suri (1177–1241) was a leading physician and botanist in the Islamic world in the 13th century. He served the leading figures of the Ayyubid dynasty.

Biography 
Al-Suri was born and brought up in Tyre, then part of the Crusader-ruled Lebanon and derives his name al-Suri from the name of the city in Arabic "Sur". After completing his preliminary education in Tyre, he moved to Jerusalem, under Ayyubid control, where he served as a physician at a hospital. He later met and greatly impressed the Ayyubid sultan al-Adil in the early 13th century. Al-Adil brought al-Suri to Cairo and made him his personal physician. He also served al-Adil's son, al-Mu'azzam and grandson, an-Nasir Dawud, the successive governors of Damascus.

Besides medicine, al-Suri held an interest for plant life and was a botany researcher. He used to roam about and study herbs and plants in their natural surroundings. He employed a professional painter to sketch and paint for him the plants in different stages of their growth as specific as possible by the use of various colors and dyes. His book, entitled al-Adwiyat al-Mufradah ("The Simple Medicines") is not extant.

References

Bibliography 
 

1177 births
1241 deaths
13th-century physicians
Physicians from the Ayyubid Sultanate
Botanists of the medieval Islamic world
Medical researchers